Botley Wood and Everett's and Mushes Copses is a  biological Site of Special Scientific Interest north of Fareham in Hampshire.

Botley Wood is nationally outstanding for butterflies, with more than 30 breeding species, including pearl-bordered fritillary, white-letter hairstreak, dark green fritillary and purple emperor. Everett's and Mushes Copses have a rich flora, with over fifty species of flowering plants typical of ancient woodlands.

References

Sites of Special Scientific Interest in Hampshire